Reformed Presbyterian may refer to:
 A mutually recognising set of churches listed at Reformed Presbyterian churches, including:
 The Reformed Presbyterian Church of Australia
 The Reformed Presbyterian Church of North America (which includes a presbytery in Japan)
 The Reformed Presbyterian Church of Ireland
 The Reformed Presbyterian Church of Scotland
 Any of the following North American churches:
 The Reformed Presbyterian Church, Evangelical Synod (split from Reformed Presbyterian Church of North America in 1833, joined Presbyterian Church in America in 1982)
 The Reformed Presbyterian Church in the United States (began in 1983, arising from the Christian Reconstruction movement)
 The Reformed Presbyterian Church General Assembly (1991-) 
 The Reformed Presbyterian Church – Hanover Presbytery (1991-)

 Various Presbyterian Reformed churches, including:
 Presbyterian Reformed Church (Australia)
 Presbyterian Reformed Church (North America)

Presbyterian denominations established in the 20th century

ja:改革長老教会